Accel, formerly known as Accel Partners, is an American venture capital firm. Accel works with startups in seed, early and growth-stage investments. The company has offices in Palo Alto, California and San Francisco, California, with additional operating funds in London, India and China (through a partnership with International Data Group (IDG-Accel)).

Accel has funded technology companies including Facebook, Slack, Dropbox, Atlassian, Flipkart, Supercell, Spotify, Etsy, Braintree/Venmo, Vox Media, Lynda.com, Qualtrics, DJI, Cloudera, Jet.com, Ethos, GoFundMe, Vectra Networks Inc. FabHotels,  BrowserStack, Vinculum Group, Instana, CleverTap, HopIn and the Egyptian company Instabug.

History
In 1983, Accel was founded by Arthur Patterson and Jim Swartz. The co-founders developed the firm's "Prepared Mind" investment philosophy based on the Louis Pasteur quote "Chance favors the prepared mind.", which requires "deep focus" and a disciplined and informed approach to investing.

In 2000, Accel entered a joint-venture with Kohlberg Kravis Roberts to form Accel-KKR a technology-focused private equity investment firm focused on control investments in middle-market companies.

In 2001, Accel opened its London office as a separate fund, to invest in European technology companies, focusing on Series A and Series B investments. Its European investments include Avito (acquired by Naspers for $1.2 billion), BlaBlaCar, Deliveroo, HopIn, Spotify and Supercell (acquired by Tencent for $8.6 billion) and UiPath among others.

In addition to Accel's continued investments in early-stage startups from the Accel early stage fund, the firm announced a $480 million growth fund in December 2008, focused on growth equity opportunities in information technology, the internet, digital media, mobile, networking, software, and services.

In March 2016, Accel raised $2 billion, $500 million for an early stage venture fund and $1.5 billion for growth investments. In April 2016, Accel raised a separate $500 million fund for investments in Europe and Israel. In November 2016, Accel's India arm closed its fifth fund with $450 million, about two years after closing its fourth fund with $325 million.

In May 2019 Accel closed a $575 million fund, which led to financing Series A of European and Israeli startups. The round was the largest in the region and the total amount of funds managed by Accel reached $3 billion.

Portfolio 
Accel is a venture capital firm that concentrates on the following technology sectors:
 Consumer
 Infrastructure
 Media
 Mobile
SaaS
 Security
 Customer care services
 Enterprise software
 E-commerce

Investments 
Accel works with seed, early and growth-stage investments. Its seed and early stage investments include Cloudera, Dropbox, Dropcam, Facebook, Flipkart, Jet.com, Podium, Webflow and Slack. The firm's growth capital investments focus on more developed companies that require a larger amount of capital to expand their business. Examples include Atlassian, DJI and Qualtrics.

Recent exits include:
 Arista Networks: IPO valuation of $2.7 billion in 2014
 Atlassian: IPO valuation of $4.4 billion in 2015
 Avito: acquired by Naspers for $1.2 billion in 2015
 Braintree: acquired by PayPal for $800 million in 2013
 Cloudera: IPO valuation of $2.3 billion in 2017 
 Despegar: IPO valuation of $1.97 billion in 2017
 Etsy: IPO valuation of $1.78 billion in 2015
 Meta: IPO valuation of $104 billion in 2012 
 ForeScout: IPO valuation of $935+ million in 2017
 Fusion-io: acquired by SanDisk for $1.1 billion in 2014
 Iron Planet: acquired by Ritchie Bros. for approximately $758.5 million in 2017
 Jet: acquired by Walmart for $3.3 billion in 2016
 Krux: acquired by Salesforce for $700 million in 2016
 Lynda.com: acquired by LinkedIn at a $1.5 billion valuation in 2015
 Legendary Pictures: acquired by Wanda Group for $3.5 billion in 2016
 Rovio: IPO valuation of $1 billion in 2017
Supercell: acquired by Softbank for $5.5 billion in 2015 and acquired by Tencent for $8.6 billion in 2016
 Trulia: IPO valuation of $448 million and acquired by Zillow for $3.5 billion in 2014
 Facilio: financed for $6,4 million together with Tiger Global.

Legal entities
Though the brand is one, there are at least 4 different, independent legal entities. In the US, it is  Accel Management Co. Inc. based in Palo Alto, California. In London, there are Accel London Management Limited and Accel Partners Management LLP. There is also IDG-Accel China, legally IDG VC Management Ltd, located in Hong Kong.

Geographies
Accel's US fund is headquartered in Palo Alto, California, with offices in San Francisco, California. Accel's European fund is headquartered in London, England and Accel's India fund is headquartered in Bangalore, India. In addition to the U.S., Accel has investments across in France, Germany, Israel, Australia, New Zealand, Brazil, Canada, China, Finland, India, Switzerland and more.

References

External links
 Accel (company website)

Venture capital firms of the United States
Private equity firms of the United States
Financial services companies based in California
Companies based in Palo Alto, California
Financial services companies established in 1983
1983 establishments in California
Venture capital firms of the United Kingdom